Moon Shadow (born March 28, 1979) is an American singer and professional wrestling personality who uses the stage name Goldylocks or Goldy Locks. She is perhaps best known for her appearances with Total Nonstop Action Wrestling as an interviewer and manager.

Early life 
Shadow was born to middle-class parents in a suburban neighborhood in North Minneapolis, Minnesota. Her father, a talented musician, taught her how to play the guitar, keyboard and violin.

Musical career 
By 1999, Shadow was an opening act for artists like Pink. In 2000, Futuristic Records released her single "Kiss", a song she wrote and recorded in English, French, and Spanish. Total Nonstop Action Wrestling has used several of Goldy Locks' songs, most notably the tracks "Take It Out On You" for Alissa Flash, "Dodging Bullets" for Trinity, "Broken" for Tara, "I Tease, U Touch" for Brooke Tessmacher, "Hands of Wicked" for Winter, "Forever" for Thea Trinidad and "The Man in Me" for TNA Entertainment President Dixie Carter.

Goldy Locks 
In June 2002 Shadow formed the band Goldy Locks, which tours all across the eastern United States, playing on average over 250 shows a year. Over the years the band has opened for the likes of Saliva, Sevendust, Nickelback, 3 Doors Down, Puddle of Mudd, Hurt, Theory of a Deadman, Collective Soul, Stevie Nicks, Pink, Bret Michaels Band, Rick Springfield, Ted Nugent, Pat Benatar, Maroon 5, The Fray, OneRepublic, Everclear, Powerman 5000, Ronnie Dunn, and Grand Funk Railroad. Goldy Locks has appeared on the following albums: "V" is For Viagra. The Remixes, TNA's Theme Songs, Top Cow Comics The Proximity Effect and Steve O's Jack Ass compilation, selling over a total of 430,000 copies. Featured on Steve O's Best of Jackass DVD. The band has worked with legendary producers: Michael Wagener, Michael Patterson, and Dale Oliver

The band has also been involved in Shadow's motivational tour, called the Today I Won't Be Afraid Tour. This tour, based around the eponymous song, has been involved with numerous charities. These have included such groups as the YWCA, D.A.R.E., Deanna Farve's HOPE Foundation, Soles for Souls and the Tennessee Breast Cancer Coalition. In collaboration with the YWCA of Middle Tennessee a coffee table book was produced entitled: "Women of the YWCA. Today I Won't Be Afraid", featuring success stories of overcoming abuse, featured in the photos. The band has also performed numerous school shows, coupled with a motivational program hosted by Shadow.

Professional wrestling career 
One of Shadow's concerts caught the attention of the upstart wrestling company NWA: Total Nonstop Action, who then hired her. Shadow took on the stage name Goldylocks and as a backstage interviewer who openly backtalked the wrestlers and later became a valet with a rich-girl gimmick. She first managed Erik Watts, her kayfabe love interest.

Later, Goldylocks broke up with Watts and Abyss became her protector. Goldylocks had Abyss wrestle Watts, announcing her money was up for grabs against Watts' contract. Abyss won, and she sold the contract to bring in rookie Alex Shelley. Goldylocks and her new "Baby Bear" Shelley went on to claim more contracts in future matches, using Abyss (who was treated as "extra luggage") to lay claim to Sonny Siaki, D-Ray 3000, and Shark Boy. In these tag matches, Goldylocks had Abyss do all the work and then brought in Shelley to pin their opponent. When Watts returned to TNA, a match was set up matching Watts, Siaki, and Desire against Abyss, Goldylocks, and Shelley. Abyss turned on Goldylocks in this match and finally left her. Shadow left TNA shortly after, and turned her attention back to music.

She continues to lend her services to the company, in the form of vocals for the theme songs of several TNA Knockouts as well as president Dixie Carter.

Post-wrestling television career 
Since leaving TNA, Shadow has appeared on a number of television programs. In 2009, she appeared on the CMT show Running Wild...With Ted Nugent. Following that, in 2014, she appeared on an episode of Extreme Cheapskates, which airs on TLC. Appearing with her band, she showcased the ways in which she saves money on the road, as well as how she goes about her crafting. She has also been a video contributor for the CBS show The Talk.

References

External links
Goldy Locks Band official site
Online World of Wrestling profile

Living people
American female professional wrestlers
American women rock singers
Sportspeople from Minneapolis
Professional wrestling managers and valets
Musicians from Minneapolis
1979 births
Singers from Minnesota
Professional wrestlers from Minneapolis
21st-century American women singers
21st-century American singers